Novak Djokovic defeated Rafael Nadal in the final, 6–3, 6–3 to win the men's singles tennis title at the 2014 Miami Open. He did not lose a single set in the entire tournament. Djokovic completed his second Sunshine Double with the win.

Andy Murray was the defending champion, but lost in the quarterfinals to Djokovic.

This was the first ATP Tour tournament of the Open Era where two semifinalists issued walkovers to their opponents, resulting in no matches in the semifinal round.

The first-round match between Jarkko Nieminen and Bernard Tomic lasted 28 minutes and 20 seconds, thus becoming the shortest recorded professional tennis match in Open Era history.

Seeds
All seeds receive a bye into the second round.

Draw

Finals

Top half

Section 1

Section 2

Section 3

Section 4

Bottom half

Section 5

Section 6

Section 7

Section 8

Qualifying

Seeds

 Andrey Golubev (qualified)
 Somdev Devvarman (first round)
 Aleksandr Nedovyesov (first round, retired)
 Thomaz Bellucci (first round, retired)
 Benjamin Becker (qualifying competition, Lucky loser)
 Alex Bogomolov Jr. (qualified)
 Dušan Lajović (qualifying competition, Lucky loser)
 Tobias Kamke (qualifying competition)
 David Goffin (qualified)
 Víctor Estrella Burgos (qualifying competition)
 Paolo Lorenzi (first round)
 Dominic Thiem (qualified)
 Jack Sock (qualified)
 Jan-Lennard Struff (qualifying competition)
 Lukáš Lacko (qualified)
 Tim Smyczek (first round)
 Denis Kudla (first round)
 Michael Russell (first round)
 Peter Gojowczyk (first round)
 Julian Reister (first round)
 Jesse Huta Galung (first round)
 Evgeny Donskoy (qualifying competition)
 Aljaž Bedene (qualified)
 Malek Jaziri (qualified)

Qualifiers

Lucky losers
  Benjamin Becker
  Dušan Lajović

Qualifying draw

First qualifier

Second qualifier

Third qualifier

Fourth qualifier

Fifth qualifier

Sixth qualifier

Seventh qualifier

Eighth qualifier

Ninth qualifier

Tenth qualifier

Eleventh qualifier

Twelfth qualifier

References
General

Specific

2014 ATP World Tour
Men's Singles
Men in Florida